King Soane Patita Maituku (1947?-) was the Tu'i Agaifo of the Kingdom of Alo from November 2002 until February 19, 2008, when he was deposed as the result of a unanimous decision taken by the kingdom's four chiefly clans.

His predecessor was Sagato Alofi. Maituku was succeeded by Petelo Vikena, who was crowned Tuigaifo on November 6, 2008.  The position had remained vacant during the intervening months.

References

External links 
 Resignation of Soane Patita Maituku
 The King, seated right, beside Visesio Moeliku
 List of rulers

1947 births
Wallis and Futuna monarchs
Living people